The GMG (Granatmaschinengewehr or "grenade machine gun") is an automatic grenade launcher developed by Heckler & Koch for the German Army. It is also often referred to as GMW or GraMaWa (Granatmaschinenwaffe).

Design details
The GMG fires 40 mm grenades at a rate of about 340 rounds per minute. It is belt-fed, and can be loaded from either side, making it easy to mount on most platforms. With a variety of day and night sights available, the GMG can be used for most medium range infantry support situations.

The weapon is 1.09 m long and has a 415 mm rifled barrel; the ammunition box has dimensions of 470 × 160 × 250 mm. The gun cycles on a recoil-operated blow-back basis. It weighs 29 kg; the tripod is an additional 11 kg.

Testing and operation 
The HK GMG was tested in the Yuma desert in Arizona in 1997 in order to compete for future United States contracts.

Users

: 304 ordered. Designated as the C16 Close Area Suppression Weapon (CASW) and licence-built by Rheinmetall Defence Canada.
 Locally known as 40 KRKK 2005

: Irish Army

: Lithuanian Armed Forces.
: Used by Pasukan Khas Laut (PASKAL) of the Royal Malaysian Navy.

: Wojska Specjalne RP.
: Used by Portuguese Army, Portuguese Marine Corps and National Republican Guard.

: Used by Sri Lanka Armoured Corps on its Main Battle Tanks & Used by Sri Lanka Navy on its Fast Attack Crafts.
: 44 purchased in 2006 for use in Afghanistan and Iraq. Designated as L134A1.
: Used by USSOCOM.

See also 

 Comparison of automatic grenade launchers

Notes

External links 

 Official page
 HKPro The 40 mm GMG

API blowback firearms
Automatic grenade launchers
40×53mm grenade launchers
Post–Cold War weapons of Germany
GMG
Military equipment introduced in the 1990s